Alan "Al" Goldstein (January 8, 1936 – October 14, 1991) was an American football player.  He was a first-team All-American end at the University of North Carolina at Chapel Hill in 1958 and played professional football for the Oakland Raiders during their inaugural 1960 season.

Goldstein was born and raised in Brooklyn, New York, and graduated from Lafayette High School.  He then attended the University of North Carolina where he played college football at the end position for the North Carolina Tar Heels football team from 1957 to 1959. As a junior, he was selected by the Football Writers Association of America and the Newspaper Enterprise Association as a first-team end on their respective 1958 College Football All-America Teams.

Goldstein was drafted by the Los Angeles Rams in the 10th round of the 1960 NFL Draft, but he opted instead to play in the newly formed American Football League.  He appeared in 14 games for the Oakland Raiders during the inaugural 1960 AFL season, compiling 27 receptions for 354 yards and one touchdown. He died in 2009 at age 55 in West Bloomfield, Michigan.

References

1936 births
1991 deaths
American football ends
North Carolina Tar Heels football players
Oakland Raiders players
Sportspeople from Brooklyn
Players of American football from New York City
Lafayette High School (New York City) alumni